November 1989 is an album by Benny Andersson that released in 1989. This album of Swedish folk music was a hit in Scandinavia. The first track, "Skallgång", was used to open the 2022 virtual concert residency ABBA Voyage.

Track listing
"Skallgång"
"Machopolska"
"Vals efter Efraim Andersson"
"Sekelskiftesidyll"
"Dans på vindbryggan"
"Stjuls"
"Tröstevisa"
"Målarskolan"
"Novell #1"
"The Conducator" (Benny Andersson & Björn Ulvaeus)
"Stockholm by night"

See also
Benny Andersson
ABBA

References

1989 albums